was a village located in Ena District, Gifu Prefecture, Japan.

As of 2003, the village had an estimated population of 3,383 and a density of 29.63 persons per km². The total area was 114.16 km².

On February 13, 2005, Kashimo, along with the towns of Fukuoka, Sakashita and Tsukechi, the villages of Hirukawa and Kawaue (all from Ena District), and the village of Yamaguchi (from Kiso District, Nagano Prefecture), was merged into the expanded city of Nakatsugawa and no longer exists as an independent municipality.

References

External links
 Official website of Nakatsugawa 

Dissolved municipalities of Gifu Prefecture
Populated places disestablished in 2005

2005 disestablishments in Japan